Drummond is a masculine given name. Notable people with the name include:

Drummond Allison (1921–1943), English war poet of the Second World War
Drummond Bone (born 1947), British scholar and current Master of Balliol College, Oxford
Drummond Brown (1885–1927), Major League Baseball catcher
Drummond Erskine (1919–2009), American character actor
Drummond Ford (1907–1942), Scottish international rugby union player
Drummond Matthews (1931–1997), British marine geologist and geophysicist
Drummond Money-Coutts (born 1986), English magician
Drummond Shiels (1881–1953), Scottish Labour politician
Drummond Bartram (2001-present), pharmacy undergraduate

Masculine given names
English masculine given names